Guido De Ruggiero (Naples, 23 March 1888 – Rome, 29 December 1948) was an historian of philosophy, university professor, and Italian politician.

Work
De Ruggiero taught history of philosophy first at the University of Messina (from 1923) and later at the University of Rome (from 1925).

Having acceded to the idealism of Giovanni Gentile and Benedetto Croce, his assertion of the values of liberalism made him a leading exponent of the resistance to Fascism. In 1925 he was among the signatories of the Manifesto of the Anti-Fascist Intellectuals, written by Benedetto Croce. He was dismissed from teaching in 1942, arrested and released only on 25 July 1943.

He was one of the founders of the anti-fascist Action Party. Later he was rector of the University of Rome from 1943 to 1944 and subsequently held the post of Minister of Public Education in the government of Ivanoe Bonomi (1944).

He was author, among other works, of an impressive history of philosophy in 13 volumes, published between 1918 and 1948, and The History of European Liberalism published in 1925, both at Laterza. One particularly notable volume by De Ruggiero is his book Existentialism: The Philosophy of Existence as it comprehensively dissects this philosophy with an even balance of exposition and analysis. It clarifies the tenets of each Existentialist thinker and provides an invaluable critique of the movement as a whole. De Ruggiero states: "I believe the time has come to draw up some kind of provisional judgement on the so-called philosophy of existence, in order to bring it back within the confines of reality."

The following works were translated into English:
 Modern Philosophy, G. Allen & Unwin, ltd., (1921).
 The History of European Liberalism, translated by R. G. Collingwood (1927)

References

Further reading 
 Mind 1949 LVIII(231):411;

External links 

 

1888 births
1948 deaths
19th-century Neapolitan people
Action Party (Italy) politicians
Education ministers of Italy
Bonomi II Cabinet
Members of the National Council (Italy)
Italian anti-fascists
Manifesto of the Anti-Fascist Intellectuals
Italian historians of philosophy
20th-century Italian philosophers
Academic staff of the University of Messina